Raúl Horacio Scarrone Carrero (18 April 1931 – 4 May 2021) was an Uruguayan Roman Catholic bishop.

Scarrone Carrero was born in Uruguay and was ordained to the priesthood in 1955. He served as the auxiliary bishop of the Roman Catholic Archdiocese of Montevideo, Uruguay and titular bishop of Ulpiana from 1982 to 1987 and as the bishop of the Roman Catholic Diocese of Florida, Uruguay.

Notes

1931 births
2021 deaths
20th-century Roman Catholic bishops in Uruguay
21st-century Roman Catholic bishops in Uruguay
People from Montevideo
Uruguayan Roman Catholic bishops
Roman Catholic bishops of Florida
Roman Catholic bishops of Montevideo